BT Counterpane, formerly Counterpane Internet Security, Inc., is a company that sells managed computer network security services. The company was founded by American cryptographer Bruce Schneier in August 1999.

Their "Enterprise Protection Suite" is a service package that includes network scanning, security device management and consulting services based on their "Managed Security Monitoring" service. BT Counterpane is the world's biggest network data security company.

The company was acquired by BT Group on 25 October 2006.

References

External links
 

1999 establishments in California
2006 disestablishments in California
2006 mergers and acquisitions
American companies established in 1999
American companies disestablished in 2006
BT Group
Companies based in Santa Clara, California
Computer companies established in 1999
Computer companies disestablished in 2006
Computer companies of the United Kingdom
Defunct computer companies of the United States
Telecommunications companies disestablished in 2006
Telecommunications companies established in 1999